The Skellig Islands, once known as "the Skellocks", are two small, steep, and rocky islands lying about  west of Bolus Head on the Iveragh Peninsula in County Kerry, Ireland. The larger of the two is Skellig Michael (also known as Great Skellig) which, together with Little Skellig, is at the centre of a  Important Bird Area established by BirdWatch Ireland in 2000. Skellig Michael is also famous for an early Christian monastery that is a UNESCO World Heritage Site.

Little Skellig

The smaller of the two islands is Little Skellig (Sceilig Bheag in Irish). It is Ireland's largest northern gannet (Morus bassanus) colony with almost 30,000 pairs, and is closed to the public. It is also one of the world's largest northern gannet colonies, and is of international importance.

Skellig Michael

Birdwatch Ireland were concerned that the Irish government allowed filming on a seabird sanctuary without third party consent.  During the 2014 nesting season, black-legged kittiwake chicks in nests were swept into the sea by the downdraught from a helicopter and devoured by gulls.

Wildlife
Both of the Skellig islands are known for their seabird colonies, and together compose one of the most important seabird sites in Ireland, both for the population size and for the species diversity. Among the breeding birds are European storm petrel  (Hydrobates pelagicus), northern gannet, northern fulmar  (Fulmarus glacialis), Manx shearwater (Puffinus puffinus), black-legged kittiwake (Rissa tridactyla), common guillemot (Uria aalge), razorbill (Alca torda) and Atlantic puffin (Fratercula arctica) (with 4,000 or more puffins on Great Skellig alone). Red-billed chough (Pyrrhocorax pyrrhocorax) and peregrine falcon (Falco peregrinus) can also be seen.

The surrounding waters have abundant wildlife with many Grey seal (Halichoerus grypus). Basking shark (Cetorhinus maximus), minke whale (Balaenoptera acutorostrata), dolphin (Delphinidae), beaked whale, and leatherback sea turtle (Dermochelys coriacea) have also been recorded. The islands have many interesting recreational diving sites due to the clear water, an abundance of life, and underwater cliffs down to 60 meters (200 feet).

Filming location
The final scene of Star Wars: The Force Awakens was shot on Skellig in July 2015, with additional filming taking place there in September 2015 for The Last Jedi, the following film in the series. The remains of the Skellig Michael monastery appear in the film, representing an ancient Jedi temple.

Earlier, the Skellig Islands served as a location in the Werner Herzog 1976 movie Heart of Glass, where the islands feature in one of the prophecies by the seer Hias.

Certain scenes from the 2012 movie Byzantium were also filmed here.

Gallery

References

External links

 UNESCO World Heritage Centre – Skellig Michael
 A Project Web Site about The Skellig Islands
 Virtual reality accessibility Project for e-learning and people with limited mobility by Burger Landmarks

 
Gaeltacht places in County Kerry
Important Bird Areas of the Republic of Ireland
Seabird colonies
Special Protection Areas in the Republic of Ireland
Uninhabited islands of Ireland